HSC 2000 Coburg is a handball club from Coburg, Germany. Currently, they compete in the 2. Handball-Bundesliga.

Accomplishments
2. Handball-Bundesliga: 1
: 2020

Team

Current squad
Squad for the 2022–23 season

Goalkeepers
1  Kristian van der Merwe
 12  Jan Kulhánek
 14  Jan Jochens

Left wingers
6  Max Jaeger
7  Felix Dettenthaler
Right wingers
 21  Florian Billek
 23  Jannes Krone
Line players
9  Bartłomiej Bis
11  Viktor Glatthard
 35  Jan Schäffer

Left backs
 22  Fynn Herzig
 66  Felix Jaeger
 71  Andreas Schröder
Centre backs
2  Max Preller
4  Tumi Steinn Rúnarsson
 18  Arkadiusz Ossowski
Right backs
 13  Merlin Fuß
 25  Jakob Knauer

Transfers
Transfers for the 2022–23 season

 Joining
  Kristian van der Merwe (GK) (from  SønderjyskE Håndbold)
  Max Jaeger (LW) (from  HC Erlangen)
  Fynn Herzig (LB) (from  VfL Gummersbach)
  Felix Jaeger (LB) (from  DJK Rimpar Wölfe)
  Arkadiusz Ossowski (CB) (from  MMTS Kwidzyn)
  Jannes Krone (RW) (from  TSV Hannover-Burgdorf)
  Bartłomiej Bis (P) (from  Górnik Zabrze)
  Viktor Glatthard (P) (from  TUSEM Essen)

 Leaving
  Miloš Grozdanić (LW) (to  RK Vojvodina)
  Karl Toom (LB) (to  Al-Sulaibikhat SC)
  Lukas Juškėnas (CB) (to  HC Buzău)
  Tobias Varvne (CB) (to  LIF Lindesberg)
  Dieudonné Mubenzem (RB) (to  EHV Aue)
  Paul Schikora (RW) (to  TuS Ferndorf)
  Stefan Bauer (P) (to  ASV Hamm-Westfalen)
  Justin Kurch (P) (to  HC Erlangen)

References

External links

German handball clubs
Handball-Bundesliga
Coburg
Sport in Upper Franconia
Handball clubs established in 2000
2000 establishments in Germany